Henawatta Grama Niladhari Division is a  Grama Niladhari Division of the  Homagama Divisional Secretariat  of Colombo District  of Western Province, Sri Lanka .  It has Grama Niladhari Division Code 482C.

Henawatta is a surrounded by the  Gehenuwala, Godagama North, Nawalamulla, Meegoda South, Kurunduwatta, Panagoda Town and Meegasmulla  Grama Niladhari Divisions.

Demographics

Ethnicity 

The Henawatta Grama Niladhari Division has  a Sinhalese majority (97.8%) . In comparison, the Homagama Divisional Secretariat (which contains the Henawatta Grama Niladhari Division) has  a Sinhalese majority (98.1%)

Religion 

The Henawatta Grama Niladhari Division has  a Buddhist majority (96.0%) . In comparison, the Homagama Divisional Secretariat (which contains the Henawatta Grama Niladhari Division) has  a Buddhist majority (96.2%)

References 

Grama Niladhari Divisions of Homagama Divisional Secretariat